Dog Island is an island on First Lake in Herkimer County, New York. It is located east of Old Forge. DeCamps Island is located northeast of Dog Island.

References

Islands of New York (state)
Islands of Herkimer County, New York